Lemberg (Stuttgart) is a hill, 384 metres high, in Baden-Württemberg, Germany.

Mountains and hills of Baden-Württemberg